The Romanian Hockey League (Campionatul Naţional) is the highest level of Romanian ice hockey. It is governed by the Federaţia Română de Hochei pe Gheaţă (FRHG) (Romanian Ice Hockey Federation).

2021/22 teams

Champions

 1925 Braşovia Braşov
 1926 No championship
 1927 Hochei Club București
 1928 Hochei Club București
 1929 Hochei Club București
 1930 Tenis Club București
 1931 Tenis Club București
 1932 Tenis Club București
 1933 Tenis Club București
 1934 Tenis Club București
 1935 Telefon Club București
 1936 Bragadiru București
 1937 Telefon Club București
 1938 Dragoș Vodă Cernăuți
 1939 No championship
 1940 Rapid București
 1941 Juventus București
 1942 Juventus București
 1943 No championship
 1944 Venus București
 1945 Juventus București
 1946 Juventus București
 1947 Juventus București
 1948 No championship
 1949 Avântul IPEIL Miercurea Ciuc
 1950 RATA Târgu Mureș
 1951 RATA Târgu Mureș
 1952 Avântul Miercurea Ciuc
 1953 Steaua București
 1954 Știința Cluj
 1955 Steaua București
 1956 Steaua București
 1957 Recolta Miercurea Ciuc
 1958 Steaua București
 1959 Steaua București
 1960 Voința Miercurea Ciuc
 1961 Steaua București
 1962 Steaua București
 1963 Voința Miercurea Ciuc
 1964 Steaua București
 1965 Steaua București
 1966 Steaua București
 1967 Steaua București
 1968 Dinamo București
 1969 Steaua București
 1970 Steaua București
 1971 Dinamo București
 1972 Dinamo București
 1973 Dinamo București
 1974 Steaua București
 1975 Steaua București
 1976 Dinamo București
 1977 Steaua București
 1978 Steaua București
 1979 Dinamo București
 1980 Steaua București
 1981 Dinamo București
 1982 Steaua București
 1983 Steaua București
 1984 Steaua București
 1985 Steaua București
 1986 Steaua București
 1987 Steaua București
 1988 Steaua București
 1989 Steaua București
 1990 Steaua București
 1991 Steaua București
 1992 Steaua București
 1993 Steaua București
 1994 Steaua București
 1995 Steaua București
 1996 Steaua București
 1997 SC Miercurea Ciuc
 1998 Steaua București
 1999 Steaua București
 2000 SC Miercurea Ciuc
 2001 Steaua București
 2002 Steaua București
 2003 Steaua București
 2004 SC Miercurea Ciuc
 2005 Steaua București
 2006 Steaua București
 2007 SC Miercurea Ciuc
 2008 SC Miercurea Ciuc
 2009 SC Miercurea Ciuc
 2010 SC Miercurea Ciuc
 2011 SC Miercurea Ciuc
 2012 SC Miercurea Ciuc
 2013 SC Miercurea Ciuc
 2014 Corona Braşov
 2015 Dunărea Galați
 2016 Dunărea Galați
 2017 Corona Braşov
 2018 SC Miercurea Ciuc
 2019 Corona Braşov
 2020 No championship
 2021 Corona Braşov
 2022 SC Miercurea Ciuc

Titles by team

References

External links 
 Official website of the Romanian Ice Hockey Federation
 Information in English about Romanian ice hockey
 Romanian ice hockey news 

 
Top tier ice hockey leagues in Europe
Professional ice hockey leagues in Romania